This is a list of all episodes of The Phil Silvers Show.

Series overview

Episodes

Pilot

Season 1 (1955–56)

Season 2 (1956–57)

Season 3 (1957–58)

Season 4 (1958–59)

Special (1959)

References

External links 

 The British Phil Silvers Appreciation Society 
 

Phil Silvers Show